The 1st Battalion of Native Cavalry, California Volunteers was a cavalry battalion in the Union Army during the American Civil War. Recruits were largely drawn from the Californio population (colloquially known as "Native Californians"), though its ranks included Yaqui and Mission Indians as well as immigrants from Mexico, Hispano America and Europe (particularly France).  In addition to its ethnic makeup, the Battalion is also considered unusual for being one of the few lancer units in the United States Army.

The Battalion spent its entire term of service in California and Arizona Territory.

Commanders
 General Andrés Pico received a commission as Major in February 1863, but never formally accepted command of the Battalion, having declined the commission on the ground of sickness and inability to ride on horseback.
 Major Salvador Vallejo commanded the Battalion from August 1864 to the following February.
 Major John C. Cremony commanded the Battalion from March 24, 1865, until it was mustered out a year later.

Company assignments
 Headquarters Battalion headquarters were located at Drum Barracks from December 31, 1864, to June 30, 1865. Relocated to Fort Yuma July 31, 1865, then at Fort Mason, Arizona Territory, August 31, 1865, to January 31, 1866. Returned to San Francisco in early 1866 to muster out in March 1866.
 Company A was largely recruited in San José and commanded by Captain José Ramón Pico.  Initially posted to the Presidio of San Francisco, in December 1863, their lances were replaced with Sharps Carbines and they were sent north to support an ongoing Bald Hills War, serving at various posts in the Humboldt Military District through February, 1865.  They were briefly posted at Benicia Barracks before marching south to join the rest of the Battalion at Drum Barracks in June 1865. Departed for Arizona Territory with the rest of the battalion in July 1865. The company was posted to Fort Mason where it remained until January 1866.
 Company B was recruited in San Francisco and the Central Coast and initially commanded by Captain Ernest H. Legross from September 1863 to March 1865 when he was replaced by Captain Porfirio Jimeno.  They were posted to the Presidio of San Francisco until January, 1865, when they were sent to Camp Low in San Juan Bautista and to re-occupy the old Presidio of Monterey and operated against the Mason Henry Gang, a group of bandits with pro-Confederate sympathies who were terrorizing the Central Valley.  They joined the rest of the Battalion at Drum Barracks in June 1865. Departed for Arizona Territory with the rest of the battalion in July 1865. The company was posted to Fort Mason where it remained until January 1866.
 Company C was recruited almost entirely in Santa Barbara and was commanded by Captain Antonio Maria de la Guerra.  They were posted to Drum Barracks in September 1864 and remained there until departing for Arizona Territory with the rest of the battalion in July 1865. The company was posted to Fort Mason where it remained until January 1866. Mustered out at Presidio of San Francisco April 1866.
 Company D was recruited in Los Angeles.  It was commanded by Captain José Antonio Sanchez from March to May 1864, then by Captain Edward Bale until May 1865 when he was replaced by Captain Thomas A. Young who served until his death from fever in Arizona Territory in December 1865.  They were assigned to Drum Barracks in March 1864 and were largely employed in construction duties, though later in that year they were increasingly employed in maintaining order in Los Angeles County and San Bernardino County, in response to threats of violence by Confederate sympathizers around the 1864 elections.  In the spring of 1865, they were briefly dispatched to Camp Cady as a base for patrols of the Mojave Road.  They left for Arizona Territory with the rest of the Battalion in July 1865. The company was posted to Fort Mason where it remained until January 1866.

Service in Arizona
After a grueling march across the Mojave and Sonoran Deserts, the Battalion arrived at their new duty station, Fort Mason, near the settlement of Calabazas on the border in August, 1865. They were joined there by Companies D, E, and G of the 7th Regiment California Volunteer Infantry. From there, the Battalion was to act against the Apaches as well as patrol the International Line against incursions by the forces of the Mexican Empire and its French allies.  The neighboring Mexican State of Sonora had recently fallen to Imperial forces (as part of the French Intervention), forcing Governor Ignacio Pesqueira to flee northward and take up temporary residence at Calabazas.

Service at Fort Mason was generally considered miserable.  Because of its somewhat swampy (by Arizona standards) location on the banks of the Santa Cruz River, the men suffered from an epidemic which at one point rendered over half of them too sick for duty and led to 8 deaths, including two of the Battalion's officers.  The post suffered from supply problems as well.  These conditions caused construction of permanent buildings at the post to slow to a halt, leaving the men to live in tents and temporary brush shelters during their service there and generally curtailing, for a time, operations against the Apaches.

These difficulties did not preclude all active service, however, from time to time, the Battalion was able to organize patrols and scouts.  Notably, shortly after their arrival at Fort Mason, Captain Pico led a detachment across the border to Magdalena, Sonora in an unsuccessful effort to recover deserters being held by Imperialist forces there.  Likewise, in November, 1865, in response to a cross-border incursion at the settlement of San Rafael by Col. Refugio Tanori and some 350 Opata militia loyal to the Imperialists, a force of Native Cavalrymen pursued the raiders as far south as Ímuris, Sonora.  Finally, the Battalion participated in a campaign against the Apaches from December 1865 to January 1866 which took them as far east as the Chiricahua Mountains and as far south as Fronteras, Sonora.

The Battalion left Arizona in February, 1866 and were mustered out in California the following March at Drum Barracks, and Company C in April in San Francisco.

See also
List of California Civil War Union units

References

  The California State Military Museum; 1st Battalion of Native Cavalry
  Tom Prezelski, Lives of the California Lancers; The First Battalion of Native California Cavalry, 1863–1866, included in The California State Military Museum; 1st Battalion of Native Cavalry
  Records of California men in the war of the rebellion 1861 to 1867 By California. Adjutant General's Office, SACRAMENTO: State Office, J. D. Young, Supt. State Printing. 1890. pp. 304–320

Units and formations of the Union Army from California
Military units and formations of the United States in the Indian Wars
Military units and formations established in 1863
1863 establishments in California
Military units and formations disestablished in 1866
1866 disestablishments in California